Polyommatus altivagans is a butterfly in the family Lycaenidae. It was described by Walter Forster in 1956. It is found in Asia Minor, the eastern Caucasus and Transcaucasia.

References

Butterflies described in 1956
Polyommatus
Butterflies of Asia